The Zeno Hicks House, also known as the McKinney-Hicks Homeplace, is a historic home and national historic district near Chesnee, South Carolina. The district encompasses one contributing building and one contributing structure. The house, built in 1886, is a two-story rectangular frame I-house built of weatherboard and hand sawn from heart pine. The house has a one-story rear addition and a one-story porch with shed roof, and extends around the façade. The property also includes a corn crib. It is associated with Zeno Hicks, a prominent local folk doctor and musician of Cherokee County.  It was listed on the National Register of Historic Places in 1989.

References

Houses on the National Register of Historic Places in South Carolina
Historic districts on the National Register of Historic Places in South Carolina
Houses completed in 1887
Houses in Cherokee County, South Carolina
National Register of Historic Places in Cherokee County, South Carolina